aka Brother and Sister, is a 1956 black-and-white Japanese film drama directed by Shūe Matsubayashi.

Cast 
 Setsuko Hara

See also 
 Ani to sono imoto (1939)

References

External links 
 

Japanese black-and-white films
1956 films
Films directed by Shūe Matsubayashi
1950s Japanese films
Japanese drama films
1956 drama films